Monticello Airport  was a public-use airport located  south of the central business district of Monticello, a village in Sullivan County, New York, United States. It was privately owned by The Jefferson Development Partners.

Facilities and aircraft 
For the 12-month period ending August 30, 2005, the airport had 15,000 general aviation aircraft operations, an average of 41 per day.

As of late 2006, the Monticello Motor Club was built on the property.  While the Monticello Motor Club is a private country club for auto enthusiasts, the property remains a private operating airport that mostly serves helicopters and a few fixed wing landings each month by the club members.

References

External links 
 from New York State DOT

Defunct airports in New York (state)
Transportation buildings and structures in Sullivan County, New York